Gaëtan Germain  (born July 2, 1990) is a French rugby union player, currently playing for the Top 14 team Bayonne.

Honours & Achievements

Personal
Top 14 top points scorer (3): 2013–14, 2015–16, 2016–17

References

External links

Itsrugby profile
Eurosport Profile

1990 births
Living people
French rugby union players
Rugby union fullbacks
Racing 92 players
CS Bourgoin-Jallieu players
CA Brive players
FC Grenoble players
Aviron Bayonnais players
People from Romans-sur-Isère
Sportspeople from Drôme